Korean Englishman (영국남자) is a YouTube channel created by internet personality duo Josh Carrott and Ollie Kendal. It features videos in Korean and English centering around South Korean culture and food.

Cast

Joshua Carrott
Joshua Carrott was born on 14 May 1989 in Brighton, England, to Daryl and Maureen Carrott. His father was a fireman, and his mother was a policewoman. His paternal grandmother was ethnically Chinese. Aged 12, his family moved from England to Qingdao, China. Carrott was first exposed to Korean culture through South Korean expatriate students at the International School of Qingdao. He then returned to England for university, majoring in Korean language studies at SOAS, University of London. He also studied a year abroad at Korea University. He is married to Gabriela Kook, an Argentine-born South Korean chef.

Ollie Kendal
Ollie Kendal is Carrott's best friend and partner, whom he met while attending SOAS in London. His father, Henry, was the vicar of St. Barnabas Church, North Finchley. He has a background in video production, as well as photography and graphic design. In 2013, he was pursuing a master's degree in biblical studies. In November of that year, he and Carrott incorporated the private limited company Kendal & Carrott in the United Kingdom. Ollie is married to Lizzie Kendal and has a daughter, Juno.

Channels

Korean Englishman
The channel initially featured the reactions of their English friends to Korean cuisine. Most famously, they introduced fire noodles to their English friends as a spicy food challenge in 2014; this later developed into the "Fire Noodle Challenge". They have since collaborated with both Western and Korean celebrities.

Jolly
Carrott and Kendal launched a second channel, "Jolly", in 2017, which produces a broader variety of content intended for a more global audience. Both Kendal and Carrott frequently have friends and family on as guests, including Kendal's brother-in-law, Chris Lee.

In 2019, over half of the channel's views came from Korea.

Other works
On Carrott's 32nd birthday, Kendal published Carrott's (partially fictitious) autobiography, which was ghostwritten by his friends, with parts of the proceeds donated to Carrot Land Adventure Park in Ohakune, New Zealand.

Controversy

In October 2020, Carrott and Kook were criticised and later investigated by police after a video was uploaded on Korean Englishman of Carrott, Kook and others violating South Korea's COVID-19 quarantine regulations. In April 2021, all the charges were dropped.

References

External links 
 
 영국남자 Korean Englishman
 Jolly

Living people
English YouTubers
South Korean YouTubers
Alumni of the University of London
Year of birth missing (living people)